Feliks Paweł Jarocki (Pacanów, 14 January 1790 – 25 March 1865, Warsaw) was a Polish zoologist and entomologist.

Life
Jarocki was a Doctor of Liberal Arts and Philosophy. He organized and managed the Zoological Cabinet of the Royal University of Warsaw from 1819 to 1862. The collection was based on that of Baron Sylwiusz Minckwitz, which included over 20,000 specimens. Jarocki built up this collection through purchases and scientific expeditions to eastern Poland. He also acquired many important books for the zoological library. When he retired the zoological collection included 65,690 specimens, and the library had 2,000 volumes. He was succeeded as curator by Władysław Taczanowski.

Jarocki was the author of Zoologia czyli zwierzętopismo ogólne podług naynowszego systemu ułożone (1821).

In September 1828 he accompanied the 18-year-old Chopin to Berlin.

References
Polish Academy of Sciences - Museum and Institute of Zoology

1790 births
1865 deaths
19th-century Polish zoologists
Polish entomologists
Polish curators
University of Warsaw alumni
Academic staff of the University of Warsaw